Siruleh Zarun (also Romanized as Sīrūleh Ẕarūn) is a village in Kuhdasht-e Shomali Rural District, in the Central District of Kuhdasht County, Lorestan Province, Iran. At the 2006 census, its population was 69, in 12 families.

References 

Towns and villages in Kuhdasht County